Spiritwood/H & M Fast Farms Aerodrome  is located  south-southwest of Spiritwood, Saskatchewan, Canada.

See also 
 List of airports in Saskatchewan

References 

Registered aerodromes in Saskatchewan
Spiritwood No. 496, Saskatchewan